Kilmarnock Football Club is a Scottish association football club based in the town of Kilmarnock. The club first competed in a European competition in 1964–65, entering the Inter-Cities Fairs Cup. In UEFA organised competitions, the club has never progressed beyond the first round. However, in the Inter-Cities Fairs Cup, Kilmarnock reached the semi-finals in 1966–67 losing out to Leeds United of England for a place in the final.

Matches

Overall record

By competition

By country

Notes

References

External links
Killie In Europe at KillieFC.com

Kilmarnock F.C.
Kilmarnock